Jestřebí is a municipality and village in Šumperk District in the Olomouc Region of the Czech Republic. It has about 700 inhabitants.

Administrative parts
The village of Pobučí is an administrative part of Jestřebí.

References

Villages in Šumperk District